The Globe de Cristal Award for best actress was first awarded in 2006.

Winners and nominees

Best Actress – Motion Picture (2006–2018)

Best Actress – Drama (2019–)

Best Actress – Comedy (2019–)

Trivia

Multiple awards 
3 awards
 Karin Viard

Multiple nominations 
5 nominations
 Marion Cotillard

3 nominations
 Cécile De France
 Sandrine Kiberlain
 Karin Viard

2 nominations
 Isabelle Adjani
 Nathalie Baye
 Leïla Bekhti
 Isabelle Carré
 Catherine Deneuve
 Émilie Dequenne
 Léa Drucker
 Virginie Efira
 Sara Forestier
 Catherine Frot
 Adèle Haenel
 Mélanie Laurent
 Kristin Scott Thomas

See also 
 César Award for Best Actress

2006 establishments in France
Awards established in 2006
Film awards for lead actress
Best actress